Savva Ivanovich Mamontov  (3 October 1841 (15 October N.S.), Yalutorovsk – 6 April 1918, Moscow) was a Russian industrialist, merchant, entrepreneur and patron of the arts.

Business career

He was a son of the wealthy merchant and industrialist Ivan Feodorovich Mamontov and Maria Tikhonovna (Lakhitina). In 1841, the family moved to Moscow. From 1852, he studied in St. Petersburg, and later at the Moscow University. In 1862 his father sent him to Baku to engage in business with the elder Mamontov's Trans-Caspian Trade Partnership.

In 1864, Savva visited Italy where he began to take lessons in singing. There he was introduced to the  daughter of Moscow merchant Grigory Sapozhnikov, 17-year-old Elizabeth, who subsequently became his wife. The wedding took place in 1865 at the Kireevo estate, near Khimki, just northwest of Moscow.

Upon his father's death in 1869, he succeeded to his share in the Moscow-Yaroslavl Railway, and at the recommendation of his father's friend, Fedor Vasilyevich Chizhov, he was elected a director of the company. In 1872 he was elected its chairman.

The extension of the railway from Sergyev Posad to Yaroslavl, begun in 1868, was opened for traffic on 18 February (2 March N.S.) 1870. A narrow-gauge branch from Uroch station to Vologda was opened on 20 June (2 July) 1872, followed by the Alexandrov-Karabanovo branch in 1877 and the Yaroslavl-Kostroma line in 1887. Mamontov also supervised the construction of the Donets Coal Railway, which connected a network of sparsely populated mining villages with the port of Mariupol, between 1875 and 1878.

The Moscow-Yaroslavl system was greatly expanded in the 1890s. The Yeremoino-Sereda line was opened in 1893, followed by Mytishchi-Shchyolkovo line in 1895. Also in 1895, the railway purchased the Shuysko-Ivanovskay and Yermolino-Seredskaya lines from the Shuysko-Ivanovskaya Railway. In 1896 the Alexandrov-Kirzhach and Belkovo-Yuryev-Polsky-Ivanovo-Teykovo lines were opened, followed by the Nerekhta-Sereda line in 1898.

The biggest expansion, especially in terms of future importance, was the construction of the Yaroslavl-Archangelsk line between 1894 and 1897. It was formally opened on 17 (29) November 1897, although difficulties with the swampy ground delayed full service on the line till 1898.

Patron of the arts

In 1870, Mamontov purchased the Abramtsevo Estate, located north of Moscow, and founded there an artists' colony which included most of the best Russian artists of the beginning of the 20th century, such as Konstantin Korovin, Rafail Levitsky, Mikhail Nesterov, Ilya Repin, Vasily Polenov, Valentin Serov, Mikhail Vrubel, the brothers Vasnetsov, sculptors Viktor Hartmann and Mark Antokolsky, as well as various others. The colony of artists who were hosted there during the 1870s and 1880s sought to recapture the quality and spirit of medieval Russian art. Several workshops were set up there to produce handmade furniture, ceramic tiles, and silks imbued with traditional Russian imagery and themes.

Mamontov also patronised the Russian Private Opera which discovered the great Russian bass, Chaliapin, and supported the Russian opera composers, Pyotr Tchaikovsky, Nikolai Rimsky-Korsakov, Alexander Borodin, Modest Musorgsky, and many others. Drama and opera on Russian folklore themes (e.g., Rimsky-Korsakov's The Snow Maiden) were produced at Abramtsevo by the likes of Konstantin Stanislavsky, with sets contributed by the brothers Vasnetsov, Mikhail Vrubel, and other distinguished artists. "The Russian Private Opera" was Mamontov's main contribution to the arts. Mamontov acted as a stage director, a conductor and a teacher of singing. The success of the "Private Opera" in the provinces was followed by a triumph in Moscow.

Downfall

Mamontov's world came crashing down when, in 1899, an audit revealed that his factories had been improved since 1890 with funds from the railway, a course of action that was contrary to law. He was compelled to resign as chairman of the railway on 30 July (11 August) 1899. (The railway company was taken over by the Imperial Ministry of Treasury on 1 (14) April 1900.) Unable to pay his creditors, he began to sell off assets to raise funds, but this course was brought to an abrupt end on 11 (23) September 1899 when he was arrested and lodged in the Taganka Prison in Moscow. Acquittal did not avert his financial ruin, for on 7 (20) July 1900 he was declared insolvent by the Moscow District Court, and his property was sold at public auction.

Savva Ivanovich Mamontov died in Abramtsevo after a long illness on 6 April 1918.

Bibliography
 Arenzon, E. Savva Mamontov. Moskva, "Russkaia kniga", ©1995.  (in Russian)
 Bakhrevskii, V. A: Savva Mamontov. Moscow,  Molodaia Gvardiia, 2000, 513 p. [15 ill.]  (in Russian)
 Haldey, Olga (2010). Mamontov's Private Opera : the search for modernism in Russian theater . Bloomington: Indiana University Press. .

Quotations
 
 "I was a rich man, that's true, but I gave up everything since I believed that money is for the people and not people for the money. Who needs money when there is no life?" (Savva Mamontov: from his Diary)
 "Contemporaries called Savva Mamontov "Savva the Magnificent" likening him to Duke Lorenzo de' Medici who was known as Lorenzo the Magnificent. But Savva Mamontov was more than a patron of arts and letters, he was a businessman as well, and his contribution to both the national economy and the arts was equally great."  (The Russian Cultural Navigator)

Popular Culture and Media
Third Eye Blind's song "Monotov's Private Opera" from the album Ursa Major is inspired by Mamontov's private opera.

See also
Russian opera

References

External links

The Russian Cultural Navigator: THE MOSCOW MEDICI (about Savva Mamontov)
The Russian Cultural Navigator: SAVVA MAMONTOV
Mamontov Savva Ivanovich, Russian entrepreneur and patron of art
 Mamontov typeface was named after Savva Ivanovich and has been inspired by Russian poster types of the beginning of the 20th century.

1841 births
1918 deaths
People from Tyumen Oblast
People from Yalutorovsky Uyezd
Russian industrialists
Russian opera directors
Opera managers
Philanthropists from the Russian Empire
19th-century philanthropists
Humanitarians from the Russian Empire
Railway entrepreneurs
Russian businesspeople in transport